Twin Rivers is an unincorporated community and census-designated place (CDP) located within East Windsor Township, in Mercer County, New Jersey, United States. As of the 2010 United States Census, the CDP's population was 7,443. Twin Rivers was the first planned unit development in New Jersey.

Geography
According to the United States Census Bureau, the CDP had a total area of 1.319 square miles (3.418 km2), including 1.280 square miles (3.315 km2) of land and 0.039 square miles (0.102 km2) of water (2.99%).

Twin Rivers is bordered by two "twin" waterways: the Rocky Brook to the south, and the Millstone River to the north.

Community
Twin Rivers is a mainly a residential community located between Monroe Township and Hightstown. It contains two elementary schools; Ethel McKnight Elementary School (located on the south side) and Perry L. Drew Elementary School (located on the north), both part of the East Windsor Regional School District. Twin Rivers is divided into four sections, known as "quads", with quads 1 & 2 on the southern side of Route 33, and quads 3 & 4 located to the north. Twin Rivers contains a community room, a shopping center and a preschool, all located in quads 1 and 2. The shopping center has restaurants, a gym, a nail salon, and a laundromat. Additionally, each quad has its own swimming pool. Twin Rivers is located along Route 33 near exit 8 of the New Jersey Turnpike and Route 133; there are several large chain hotels within  of the CDP.

Demographics

Census 2010

Census 2000
As of the 2000 United States Census there were 7,422 people, 2,748 households, and 2,033 families living in the CDP. The population density was 2,274.3/km2 (5,906.9/mi2). There were 2,818 housing units at an average density of 863.5/km2 (2,242.8/mi2). The racial makeup of the CDP was 76.25% White, 10.16% African American, 0.08% Native American, 6.25% Asian, 0.19% Pacific Islander, 4.61% from other races, and 2.47% from two or more races. Hispanic or Latino of any race were 14.63% of the population.

There were 2,748 households, out of which 33.4% had children under the age of 18 living with them, 58.1% were married couples living together, 11.0% had a female householder with no husband present, and 26.0% were non-families. 21.2% of all households were made up of individuals, and 4.3% had someone living alone who was 65 years of age or older. The average household size was 2.70 and the average family size was 3.12.

In the CDP the population was spread out, with 23.5% under the age of 18, 8.7% from 18 to 24, 30.6% from 25 to 44, 30.9% from 45 to 64, and 6.4% who were 65 years of age or older. The median age was 37 years. For every 100 females, there were 97.6 males. For every 100 females age 18 and over, there were 94.5 males.

The median income for a household in the CDP was $62,760, and the median income for a family was $69,494. Males had a median income of $45,840 versus $33,393 for females. The per capita income for the CDP was $26,501. About 2.7% of families and 4.6% of the population were below the poverty line, including 4.7% of those under age 18 and 4.5% of those age 65 or over.

References

External links

Twin Rivers Community Website

Census-designated places in Mercer County, New Jersey
East Windsor, New Jersey